Diseases of the Colon & Rectum is a monthly peer-reviewed medical journal covering colorectal surgery. It was established in 1958 and is published by Lippincott Williams and Wilkins on behalf of the American Society of Colon and Rectal Surgeons, of which it is the official journal. The editor-in-chief is Susan Galandiuk (University of Louisville). According to the Journal Citation Reports, the journal has a 2016 impact factor of 3.519.

References

External links
 

Colorectal surgery
Surgery journals
Publications established in 1958
Monthly journals
Academic journals associated with learned and professional societies of the United States
English-language journals
Gastroenterology and hepatology journals